Belozerovo is a rural locality (a village) in Ust-Alexeyevskoye Rural Settlement, Velikoustyugsky District, Vologda Oblast, Russia. The population was 8 as of 2002.

Geography 
The distance to Veliky Ustyug is 54 km, to Ust-Alexeyevo is 2 km. Dresvishche is the nearest rural locality.

References 

Rural localities in Velikoustyugsky District